Aleksa Vulovic is an Australian comedian and YouTube personality. His videos have often gained widespread media attention in Australian media, including his participation in the 2020 "Australian" Utah monolith, his journey to North Korea to get a haircut, and for being allowed to enter Australia's second-largest casino after appearing dressed in a hospital gown and IV drip during the COVID-19 pandemic in Australia. Much of his work is made in collaboration with The Chaser, and has also worked with Aunty Donna.

Vulovic is also the co-star of Boy Boy, alongside fellow comedian Alex Apollonov of the I did a thing YouTube channel. Apollonov and Vulovic regularly cooperate on their respective projects and appear in each other's videos.

Boy Boy (2016–present) 
In 2016, Aleksa Vulovic and fellow comedian Alex Apollonov founded the YouTube channel Boy Boy. Much of the content centered around myth-busting sensationalist claims in Australian media, while also using comedy to bring light to issues such as climate change, colonialism, police violence, and racism. One video produced by this channel included Apollonov calling an Australian anti-terrorist hotline and reporting Vulovic for wanting to join a violent militaristic organisation with ties to violence in the middle-east, which at the end of the video was revealed to be the Australian military. Due to the low traffic of the Boy Boy channel, Apollonov created a new channel in 2018 called I Did a Thing, which Vulovic often appears on, though the two still upload videos to Boy Boy on a less frequent basis.

The Haircut (2017) 
The short documentary-style movie titled The Haircut (2017) was the most successful comedic project produced by the Boy Boy channel and would gain widespread coverage from Australian media which would help launch Aleksa Vulovic's career as a professional comedian. In the movie, Aleksa Vulovic and Alex Apollonov both travelled to North Korea to investigate dubious claims in Australian media that North Koreans were either forced to cut their hair like Kim Jong-un or that their government orders which hairstyles their citizens are allowed to have. During their investigation, neither Vulovic nor Apollonov could find any evidence to support the claims of government-mandated hairstyles and came to the conclusion that these stories were most likely fake. "When we started to look into some of those media stories we found out that a lot of them weren't true." Apollonov further described his opinions on Australian/USA relations with the DPRK, saying that "North Korea has tested four [nukes], and that is very scary… but imagine how scary it is for them to think that the US alone has tested 1,032 nukes? … We've used ours… against real people." Vulovic shared Apollonov's opinions, saying that "What the haircut law and all these other 'amazing' stories share in common is at the very centre of this media whirlwind, they are based on absolutely nothing."

The Hooligans (2018) 
To investigate news of violence among Russian football hooligans, Aleksa Vulovic and Alex Apollonov both travelled to Russia together to interview fans of various Russian football clubs and embedded themselves within groups accused of hooligan violence. Apollonov said that his reasoning for creating this short documentary was that "As a film maker I'd never miss the opportunity to film my mate (Aleksa Vulovic) getting beaten up overseas."

Collaborations

Covid Casino stunt (2020) 
During the COVID-19 pandemic, Aleksa Vulovic and Alex Apollonov partnered with The Chaser to create a comedic investigation where they attempted to enter Australia's second-largest casino, The Star (Sydney) while displaying as many symptoms of Covid as possible to see whether they would be allowed inside during the pandemic. In one attempt, Aleksa tried entering the casino while dressed in hospital surgical garbs, dragging an IV drip stand on wheels, with a high forehead temperature. Despite telling the casino staff that he had come straight from a nearby hospital, he was allowed to enter the casino where he spent his time using the gaming machines while wearing a white shirt saying "I have covid" in bold black letters. "When I rocked up with my hospital gown and drip, the first thing they asked me was whether I had a Star Casino gold membership card." Apollonov followed Aleksa into the casino with a forehead temperature of 48 degrees (achieved using heat packs), which the staff detected with a temperature gun and was still allowed entry to the casino. "My head was still really hot after I got inside," said Apollonov. "I must have drunk 3 or 4 of their complimentary water bottles. They're obviously very used to catering for sick customers." When asked about possible legal repercussions over their comedic stunt, Vulovic replied "There's no point suing us, we already lost all our savings on big wheel during our filming breaks."

2020 Monolith project (2020) 
In 2020, a mysterious metal monolith of unknown origin appeared in Utah, dubbed the Utah monolith. As more of these monoliths appeared across the globe in England, Romania and the Netherlands, Vulovic teamed up with Australian comedy group Aunty Donna to create their own metal monolith which they planted in Australia. The monolith was planted outside Melbourne, Australia. Aunty Donna jokingly said that their monolith and the collaboration with 'I Did a Thing' was to promote their upcoming Netflix show.

References 

Australian comedians
Australian YouTubers
Australian people of Serbian descent

Living people
Year of birth missing (living people)